Íñigo Dávalos (died 1484) was a Castilian general who served the Crown of Aragon in Italy.

His grandfather, Ruy López Dávalos, had been constable of Castile. Íñigo came to Italy with Alfonso V of Aragon in 1442. He took part in the naval battle of Ponza in 1435. In 1452, after the Aragonese conquest of the Kingdom of Naples, he was made Count of Monteodorisio.

In 1452 he married Antonella d'Aquino, heiress to the marquisate of Pescara, which was thenceforth part of the family's fiefs. Íñigo died in Naples in 1484: his lands were inherited by his son Alphonso. His grandsons Alfonso and Fernando and his great grandson Francesco Ferdinando d'Avalos were generals for Spain in the Italian Wars.

Íñigo has been proposed as the author of the romance Curial e Güelfa.

Notes

1484 deaths
Counts of Italy
Spanish untitled nobility
Spanish generals
Knights of the Garter
Innico 01
Year of birth unknown